Janaúba is a municipality in the north of the Brazilian state of Minas Gerais.  In 2020 the population was 72,018 in a total area of 2,189 km2.  The elevation is 692 meters above sea level.

Location

The distance to the state capital, Belo Horizonte, is 547 km. The most important city in the north of Minas, Montes Claros, is 132 km. away.  Neighboring municipalities are:
South: Francisco Sá
Southeast: Riacho dos Machados
East and Northeast: Porteirinha and Nova Porteirinha
North: Jaíba
Northwest: Verdelândia
West: Capitão Enéas and São João da Ponte.

Microregion
Janaúba is also a statistical microregion (30) consisting of 13 municipalities: Catuti, Espinosa, Gameleiras, Jaíba, Janaúba, Mamonas, Mato Verde, Monte Azul, Nova Porteirinha, Pai Pedro, Porteirinha, Riacho dos Machados and Serranópolis de Minas. The area is 15,191.70 km² and the population was 230,786 in 2000.

Districts and villages
Districts: Sede, Barreiro da Raiz, Quem-Quem and Vila Nova dos Poções.
Villages: Pedra Preta, Baixa da Colônia, Algodões II, Monte Alto, Lagoa Grande, Barroquinha, Maromba, Quem-Quem, and Assentamento da Fazenda Marabá.

Climate
The climate is sub-humid to semi-arid, with irregular rainfall and occasional long periods of drought. During this period, that may include the months of September and October, the deficiency in the soils is deep and the waters of the rivers drop to critical levels.

In winter, due to the action of masses of polar air the temperature can reach .

In the summer there are high temperatures, especially in the months of December to February. The climate is overall hot and dry.

The economy
The main economic activities are cattle raising and the growing of grains.  In 2006 there were 111,000 head of cattle.  The main agricultural products were bananas (2,170 hectares), grapes, mangoes, and coconut.

There were 308 transformation industries employing more than 2,700 people.  There was a Dow Chemical facility producing cleaning products.  Other industries produced  furniture, soft drinks, perfumes, animal food, and clothing.  Due to the poor soils sand is one of the most important natural resources, and is exported to all the state for use in civil construction.  Clay is also abundant and is used in the manufacturing of bricks and tiles, as well as in pieces of local ceramic.

Festivals
Janaúba is well known for its carnival festivities, known as "Janafolia".  An event that attracts many visitors is the Agricultural Fair, which is now in its twentieth year.

Health and education
There were 2 hospitals with 101 beds, together with 7 health centers in the urban area and 3 in the rural zone.  According to the official site of the city the educational level of the general population is low, especially the older rural inhabitants who can usually only write their own name.
The city offers 7 courses to teach its citizens to read and write.  In the school system there were 39 primary schools and 7 middle schools (2006).  There were also 6 majors offered by private schools of higher education, including a major in agronomy.

Municipal Human Development Index
MHDI: .715
State ranking: 478 out of 853 municipalities
National ranking: 2,7081 out of 5,138 municipalities
Life expectancy: 69
Literacy rate: 80 For the complete list see Frigoletto

See also
List of municipalities in Minas Gerais

References

City government
IBGE

Municipalities in Minas Gerais